The Continental Indoor Soccer League (CISL) was a professional indoor soccer league that played from 1993 to 1997.

History
In the summer of 1989 Dr Jerry Buss, the owner of the Los Angeles Lakers and California Sports, told his executive Vice President, Ron Weinstein, he was closing the doors on the Los Angeles Lazers of the Major Indoor Soccer League, MISL, and that if he ever wanted to "create a professional indoor soccer league that played in the summer months, out from under the shadow of the NBA, NFL, NHL, NCAA Football and NCAA Basketball", he would support the endeavor.  It was then that the seed was planted in Ron's mind.  
One year later, in the fall of 1990, Ron Weinstein incorporated the Continental Indoor Soccer League, CISL.  Ron, along with his business partner Jorge Ragde, drafted all the necessary franchise documents to bring the league into fruition and create what was the first professional sports league to operate under the "single entity" formula in 1991. Jerry Buss stood by Ron every step of the way until Earvin "Magic" Johnson announced he was HIV positive.  Jerry's mind was understandably taken elsewhere for a short period of time. Prior to his temporary absence, Jerry and Ron reached out to Phoenix Suns owner, Jerry Colangelo, and convinced him to be one of the inaugural members of the League.

In Dr. Buss's absence, Colangelo stepped up to the plate to take the lead role in working with Ron to attract NBA and NHL owners.  Through Buss's and Colangelo's cooperative efforts they orchestrated two CISL meetings in conjunction with their own NBA Board of Governors meetings.  The first was held in 1991 in Marina Del Rey and the second in New York City in 1992.  Needless to say their efforts paid off and the CISL was launched with 7 teams committed to begin playing in the summer of 1993 with another eight contracted for 1994.

Monterrey La Raza made the CISL the first US league to have a team from Mexico participating. In 1995, a second team entered the league, the Mexico City Toros.
By the end of the 1995 season, the third year of the league, 50% of the teams were already profitable; a feat unprecedented in professional sports history. In 1996, Ron signed a three-year agreement with FOX Sports to televise a game of the week nationally in prime time.  Concurrently he signed with General Motors to a three-year million dollar contract to be the official car of the CISL. That same year, the Indiana Twisters became the next expansion franchise admitted to the league.

"The league has become very credible. ... We definitely look upon ourselves as a major-league sport.  If you look at the roots of the NBA, NHL, Major League Baseball and NFL, we are so far ahead of the game from where they were when they finished their fourth year." Ron Weinstein was quoted saying to the Houston Chronicle. 
 
In the fall of 1997, the surprising demise of the league took place primarily due to differences of direction between the NBA/NHL owners and three of the leagues non NBA/NHL teams: Dallas, Portland and Houston. They collaborated in an effort to leave the CISL and form their own league, The Premier Soccer Alliance. It is the opinion of many executives within the sports world, that indoor Soccer has never again reached the pinnacle of the CISL since operations formally ceased in the winter of 1998.

The Continental Indoor Soccer League Championship Trophy was titled the "Lawrence Trophy" named in honor of the commissioner and founder's father, Lawrence Albert Weinstein.

Teams

Lawrence Trophy Champions

By Team

Annual awards

Most Valuable Player
1993: Tatu, Dallas Sidekicks
1994: Tatu, Dallas Sidekicks
1995: Preki, San Jose Grizzlies
1996: Tatu, Dallas Sidekicks
1997: Paul Dougherty, Houston Hotshots

Goalkeeper of the Year
1993: Joe Papaleo, Dallas Sidekicks
1994: Antonio Cortes, San Diego Sockers
1995: Mike Dowler, Sacramento Knights
1996: Juan de la O, Seattle SeaDogs
1997: Juan de la O, Seattle SeaDogs

Coach of the Year
1993: Gordon Jago, Dallas Sidekicks
1994: George Fernandez, Anaheim Splash
1995: Erich Geyer, Monterrey La Raza
1996: Trevor Dawkins, Houston Hotshots
1997: Fernando Clavijo, Seattle SeaDogs

Rookie of the Year
1993: Marco Lopez, Monterrey La Raza
1994: John Olu–Molomo, San Diego Sockers
1995: Mark Chung, San Diego Sockers
1996: Carlos Farias, San Diego Sockers
1997: Guillermo Castaneda, Washington Warthogs

Defender of the Year
1993: Sean Bowers, Sacramento Knights
1994: Ralph Black, Anaheim Splash
1995: Danny Pena, Sacramento Knights
1996: Troy Snyder, Washington Warthogs
1997: Genoni Martinez, Monterrey La Raza

Playoff MVP
1993: Tatu, Dallas Sidekicks
1994: Branko Šegota, Las Vegas Dustdevils
1995: Zizinho, Monterrey La Raza
1996: Raul Salas, Monterrey La Raza
1997: Juan de la O, Seattle SeaDogs

References

External links
All-Time CISL Standings
All-Time CISL Attendance
 Continental Indoor Soccer League history – American Soccer History Archives
CISL rules and regulations from The Indianapolis Star (1996)

 
1993 establishments in the United States
1997 disestablishments in the United States
Sports leagues established in 1993
Organizations disestablished in 1997
Defunct indoor soccer leagues in the United States
1993 in American soccer leagues
1994 in American soccer leagues
1995 in American soccer leagues
1996 in American soccer leagues
1997 in American soccer leagues